The Mater Ecclesiae Monastery (Latin for 'Mother of the Church') is a monastery in Vatican City. It was founded around 1990 by Pope John Paul II as a monastery for cloistered nuns. Benedict XVI lived there from his resignation in 2013 till his death in 2022.

History

The monastery, named after a Catholic title for Mary as "Mother of the Church", is located on the Vatican Hill inside the Vatican Gardens and near the Aquilone fountain. It was founded by Pope John Paul II in order to have a  community of nuns of an enclosed religious order inside Vatican City, who were to pray for the pope in his service to the Catholic Church. This task was first entrusted to the Poor Clares with the understanding that a different order of nuns would be invited to occupy the Monastery every five years. With the start of renovation works in November 2012, the last nuns moved out.

The building was erected between 1992 and 1994 in place of an administrative building of the Vatican police. Its structure is incorporated into the Leonine walls. The building is divided in two parts: The western chapel (two floors and rectangular in shape) and the eastern community rooms and monastic cells (rectangular in shape and, on the Aquilone fountain's side, with four floors, with 12 monastic cells on the second and third floors, and a refectory, store, kitchen, infirmary, archives and an office-studio on the ground and lower ground floors). Adjacent to the monastery is a fruit and vegetable garden. Pope Benedict XVI visited the monastery several times and celebrated Mass for the nuns.

After his retirement in February 2013, Benedict moved into the monastery on 2 May 2013. He lived there accompanied by a few assistants, with their domestic needs cared for by a small community of women belonging to a secular institute called Memores Domini, part of the Communion and Liberation movement. He died there on 31 December 2022.

Resident religious orders
The nuns who have occupied the monastery are:
 Order of Saint Clare (1994–1999)
 Order of the Discalced Carmelites (1999–2004)
 Order of Saint Benedict (2004–2009)
 Order of the Visitation of Holy Mary (2009–2012)

See also
 Index of Vatican City-related articles

References

External links 
 

20th-century Christian monasteries
Benedictine nunneries in Italy
Carmelite monasteries in Italy
Monasteries in Vatican City
Poor Clare monasteries in Italy
Pope Benedict XVI
Visitation monasteries